Tabernaemontana inconspicua is a species of plant in the family Apocynaceae. It is found in Cameroon to Angola.

References

inconspicua